Austreskorve Glacier is a broad glacier in the Mühlig-Hofmann Mountains which drains north from a position just east of the head of Vestreskorve Glacier and passes along the east side of Breplogen Mountain. It was mapped and named from surveys and from air photos by the Sixth Norwegian Antarctic Expedition (1956–60).

See also
 List of glaciers in the Antarctic
 Glaciology
 Styggebrekkufsa Bluff

References
 

Glaciers of Queen Maud Land
Princess Astrid Coast